Garig is a rural locality (a selo) in Lyakhlinsky Selsoviet, Khivsky District, Republic of Dagestan, Russia. The population was 33 as of 2010.

Geography 
Garig is located 24 km north of Khiv (the district's administrative centre) by road. Lyakhlya is the nearest rural locality.

References 

Rural localities in Khivsky District